John D. Miller may refer to:

 John Miller (minister)
 John D. Miller (television executive)